Cake icing may refer to
Icing (food), often used on cakes
Cake decorating, often including the use of icing